Trent Dimas (born November 10, 1970) is an Hispanic American gymnast and Olympic champion. Now retired, Dimas was an elite senior level international artistic gymnast.

Dimas became a member of the U.S. junior national team at the age of 13 and made the U.S. senior national team at the age of 15. He attended the University of Nebraska his freshman year  where he became a two time All American and a member of UNL's 1990 NCAA Men's Gymnastics championship team. After one season of NCAA competition, Dimas left his athletic scholarship to train full-time in hopes of making a U.S. Olympic Team.

Athletic career
As a nationally and internationally ranked athlete, he competed at the Goodwill Games (Team, Silver),  Pan American Games (FX, Bronze and HB, Bronze) (See Gymnastics at the 1991 Pan American Games), won the American Cup (AA)  and was the U.S. Men's Vault Champion, Parallel Bars Champion and Horizontal Bar Champion.

In an era of compulsory routines and a straightforward format to Olympic team trials (and before apparatus specialists), Dimas was ranked 5th All Around at trials (top 6 made the Olympic Team) which placed him on the U.S. Olympic Team roster. He competed all six of the men's apparatuses in qualification at the 1992 Summer Olympics in Barcelona where he received a gold medal on horizontal bar in the event final. This was the second time that an American gymnast, male or female, won a gold medal in an Olympics held outside the United States. Only Frank Kriz (on vault at Paris in 1924) had done so previously. Dimas is also the only Hispanic American ever to win a gold medal on the horizontal bar.

Education
Following his athletic career, in 1992, Dimas graduated from Columbia University School of General Studies in New York City with a B.A. in political science.

References

External links

1970 births
Living people
American male artistic gymnasts
Gymnasts at the 1992 Summer Olympics
Olympic gold medalists for the United States in gymnastics
Columbia University School of General Studies alumni
Medalists at the 1992 Summer Olympics
Pan American Games bronze medalists for the United States
Pan American Games medalists in gymnastics
Gymnasts at the 1991 Pan American Games
Medalists at the 1991 Pan American Games